Pico Agudo (Portuguese for "acute peak") may refer to:

Azores
 , a peak near the village of Agualva on Terceira Island
 , a peak near the village of Santa Bárbara on Terceira Island

Brazil
 Pico Agudo (Ibaiti), a peak in the municipality of Ibaiti, state of Paraná
 , a peak in the municipality of Santo Antônio do Pinhal, state of São Paulo
 Pico Agudo (Sapopema), a peak in the municipality of Sapopema, state of Paraná

Cape Verde
 Pico Agudo (São Nicolau), a village in the municipality of Ribeira Brava, São Nicolau